A by-election was held in the United Kingdom Parliament constituency of Chesham and Amersham on 17 June 2021, following the death of the sitting member, Dame Cheryl Gillan, on 4 April 2021. Gillan had served as MP for the constituency since 1992. The by-election was the third to the 58th Parliament, which was elected in 2019.

The Liberal Democrat candidate, Sarah Green, won the by-election with 56.7% of the vote and a swing from the Conservatives of 25.2%. This is the first time a non-Conservative candidate has won this seat since its formation in 1974.

The Liberal Democrats subsequently won the by-elections in North Shropshire, in December 2021, and in Tiverton and Honiton, in June 2022.

Background

Constituency 
Chesham and Amersham, named after the market towns of Chesham and Amersham in the constituency, was held by the Conservative Party since its creation at the February 1974 election until the by-election. The local authority is Buckinghamshire Council and the seat is coterminous with the abolished Chiltern District. The area is in the London commuter belt, and is home to many affluent professionals.

History 
In June 2016, 55% of voters in the coterminous Chiltern District voted to remain in the European Union (EU) in the EU membership referendum. The estimated turnout of 83.6% was the highest figure for any constituency in the UK, with only Gibraltar reporting a higher percentage. At the 2019 European Parliament elections, the pro-EU Liberal Democrats were the most popular party in the Chiltern District with 31.9%, with the pro-Leave Brexit Party in second place with 30%. Despite the seat voting Remain, Gillan, a supporter of Brexit, was re-elected with over half the vote in both the general elections following the referendum.

Representation 
The seat has had three MPs since its creation: Ian Gilmour, briefly Secretary of State for Defence under Edward Heath, and Lord Privy Seal under Margaret Thatcher; Cheryl Gillan, Secretary of State for Wales under David Cameron and Chair of the 1922 Committee in 2019; and now Sarah Green, elected in June 2021.

Campaign

Candidates 
Liberal Democrats – Sarah Green, a training and communications professional. Green was the party's candidate in Ynys Môn in the 2005 general election, coming fifth with 6.8% of the vote (while serving as Chair of MIDR Cymru (now Welsh Young Liberals)), and Arfon in North Wales in 2010, coming fourth, with 14.1% of the vote.
Conservative Party – Peter Fleet, Chairman of the Retail Automotive Alliance and former president of Ford Asia Pacific. Fleet was the Conservative candidate for Southampton Itchen in the 1997 general election, and came second with 28.4% of the vote.
 Green Party – Carolyne Culver, Green Party group leader on West Berkshire Council.
 Breakthrough Party – Carla Gregory, a charity worker from the local area.
 Labour Party – Natasa Pantelic, elected member of Slough Borough Council, and its lead member for health and wellbeing.
 Freedom Alliance – Adrian Oliver, former member of the Green Party, elected as a councillor for the Greens in Camden in the 2006 election.
Reform UK – Alex Wilson, who previously worked for HS2 Ltd.
Rejoin EU – Brendan Donnelly, a former Conservative Member of European Parliament.

Tactical proposal 
On 9 May, former Conservative MP Phillip Lee, who joined the Liberal Democrats before the 2019 election, urged the Labour and Green parties not to stand candidates in the by-election to avoid vote splitting. Lee argued that the Conservative Party would be more likely to lose if the anti-Conservative vote went to the Liberal Democrat candidate alone. Writing in The Guardian on 14 May, columnist Polly Toynbee also called for an electoral alliance of the Liberal Democrats, Labour and the Green Party to beat the Conservatives. However, all three parties contested the by-election.

Writ and polls 
On 12 May, the writ for the by-election was moved in the House of Commons by Government Chief Whip Mark Spencer.

On 30 May, The Independent reported that internal party polling by the Liberal Democrats put the Conservatives on 45.5% and the Liberal Democrats on 35.1%, a swing of 9.35% to them. The same survey also found 60% of Labour and Green voters were willing to vote tactically. Further internal party polling by the Liberal Democrats, reported by City A.M., found a closer margin, with the Conservatives on 45% and the Liberal Democrats on 41%. Despite these figures, YouGov's director of political research said "the by-election will be tough to win for the Lib Dems" due to the party putting itself up against a "popular government", unlike when it had won by-elections in the past. Lib Dem leader Ed Davey said that he visited the constituency 16 times during the campaign.

Results

Response 
The results shocked the political landscape, as politicians and pundits had predicted a Conservative win in the run-up to the by-election. John Curtice, Professor of Politics at the University of Strathclyde, expressed the view that the Liberal Democrats overperformed and compared the by-election to the 1991 Ribble Valley by-election, in which the Liberal Democrats gained a Conservative seat because of local issues. He relayed some locals were "hearing the Conservatives talking endlessly, talking about 'leveling up' – wondering really, well what is, quite, in it for us?" Some commentators suggested the result may indicate wider difficulties for the Conservative Party across the south of England, drawing comparisons to the Labour Party's problems holding on to many of its older bases of support.

This was the lowest ever share of the vote in a Westminster election by a Labour Party candidate.

Previous result

See also
 2019 Brecon and Radnorshire by-election
 2021 North Shropshire by-election

References

2021 elections in the United Kingdom
By-elections to the Parliament of the United Kingdom in Buckinghamshire constituencies
June 2021 events in the United Kingdom
Politics of Buckinghamshire
2021 C
2021 in England